Opened in 1984, the University of South Florida College of Public Health, offers master's degrees in Public Health (MPH),  a Master of Science in Public Health (MSPH) which is a more academic and research oriented master's degree, and a master's degree in Health Administration (MHA), along with a doctorate (PhD) in Public Health and several dual degrees in collaboration with other colleges- most notably the dual PhD/MPH program in Applied Anthropology. The MHA in Public Health Practice is an innovative program for health professionals which can be attained through weekend executive or distance learning format.

The college offers classes at the north Tampa, Florida campus and at satellite locations throughout Florida. Using the Internet, the Distance Learning Program gives students anywhere in Florida, at the Centers for Disease Control and Prevention in Atlanta, Georgia and in Belize the opportunity to complete selected courses or earn the MPH degree in Public Health Practice.

Academics
University of South Florida College of Public Health, along with the University of Florida and FIU are the only public health colleges in Florida accredited by the Council on Education for Public Health. It has 5 main departments:

 The Community and Family Health Department offers degrees in Maternal and Child Health, Public Health Education, Behavioral Health, Socio-Health Sciences, and Community and Family Health.
 The Environmental and Occupational Health Department offers degrees in Environmental Health, Toxicology and Risk Assessment, Safety Management, Industrial Hygiene, and Occupational Health.
 The Epidemiology and Biostatistics Department offers degrees in Epidemiology and Biostatistics along with combined degrees in Epidemiology and Biostatistics as well as Epidemiology and Global Health.
 The Global Health Department offers degrees in Global Communicable Disease, Global Disaster Management & Humanitarian Relief, Global Health Practice, and a combined degree in Epidemiology and Global Health.
  The Health Policy and Management offers degrees in Health Policy and Management, Health Administration, Health Care Organization and Management, Public Health Administration, and Health Policies and Programs.
 The school also offers college wide degrees in Public Health Practices and Masters International Peace Corps Program.

Research
The college's population-based research helps to promote health and prevent disease across the life span in Florida and the global community. The college's research centers include the following:
 Center for Biological Defense
 Global Center for Disaster Management and Humanitarian Action
 The Florida Prevention Research Center
 Harrell Center for the Study of Family Violence
 Center for Positive Health
 Center for Leadership in Public Health Practice
 Sunshine Education and Research Center
 Center for Health, HIV/AIDS Research and Training in India (CHART)
 Lawton and Rhea Chiles Center for Healthy Mothers and Babies
 OSHA Training Institute Education Center

Surveys:
 The USF College of Public Health completed a survey in The Villages returned by more than 33,000 individuals – the largest ever single health survey of older Americans. The study will be used to help understand optimum ways to improve and maintain senior health.

Online Programs

The College of Public Health offers a variety of graduate degrees and certificate programs in an online format to suit the needs of the off-campus student. All online degree and certificate programs are designed by program faculty who work with instructional designers in the college's office of Educational Technology and Assessment (ETA). Each year ETA supports over 5000 student enrollments in graduate and undergraduate online public health courses. Faculty work with a skilled group of instructional designers and multimedia experts to deliver courses using multimedia technologies such streaming media, web conferencing, blogs, wikis, podcasts and discussion forums.

Master of Public Health (MPH) Degree Programs
 MPH with a Concentration in Public Health Practice
 MPH with a Concentration in Public Health Administration
 MPH with a Concentration in Global Disaster Management and Humanitarian Relief
 MPH with a Concentration in Epidemiology
 MPH with a Concentration in Infection Control (online) – admitting students Fall 2013
 MPH with a Concentration in Health, Safety & Environment (online) – admitting students Spring 2013

Graduate Certificates
 Public Health Generalist
 Concepts and Tools Of Epidemiology
 Disaster Management
 Humanitarian Assistance
 Infection Control
 Maternal and Child Health Epidemiology
 Public Health Policy and Programs
 Social Marketing
 Applied Biostatistics
 Epidemiology of Infectious Diseases

Community Impact

Faculty

Teaching Affiliates

Campus

Hinks & Elaine Shimberg Health Science Library
Founded in 1971, the Hinks & Elaine Shimberg Health Science Library serves the University of South Florida College of Medicine, the University of South Florida College of Nursing, and the University of South Florida College of Public Health.

External links
https://www.healthcare-management-degree.net/faq/mph-vs-msph/
University of South Florida Public Health
National Cancer Institute
National Institutes of Health

University of South Florida
Medical and health organizations based in Florida
Schools of public health in the United States
Educational institutions established in 1971
Education in Tampa, Florida
Universities and colleges in Hillsborough County, Florida
1971 establishments in Florida